Serasan Sekate Stadium is a multipurpose stadium in Musi Banyuasin, South Sumatra, Indonesia.  It is currently used mostly for football matches. It is the home of Persimuba Musi Banyuasin and Muba Babel United.

References 

Buildings and structures in South Sumatra
Multi-purpose stadiums in Indonesia
Sports venues in Indonesia
Football venues in Indonesia
Athletics (track and field) venues in Indonesia
Sports venues in South Sumatra
Football venues in South Sumatra
Athletics (track and field) venues in South Sumatra
Multi-purpose stadiums in South Sumatra